Yogi Vemana University  is a newly established university in the Kadapa district with its West Campus at Idupulapaya. Earlier, it was a part of Sri Venkateswara University. It is named after a great thinker, philosopher, and social reformer Yogi Vemana, the most celebrated Telugu poet and sage of all time.

It is located at Mittamedipalli village and Panchayat about 15 km from the Kadapa on the Kadapa-Pulivendla road.

History
Late Dr. Y S Rajasekhara Reddy, the former Chief Minister of Andhra Pradesh donated his  of land to build West Campus. A modern concept school, which is called a 21st-century gurukul. The university is named after Yogi Vemana, who is known for his philosophical teachings and practising Achala Paripurna Raja Yoga. Children are taught his teachings and poems at school as part of regular syllabus and moral science at schools.

This university was known earlier as Sri Venkateswara University PG Centre, Kadapa. This PG centre at Kadapa was established as a constituent institute of Sri Venkateswara University, Tirupati on 20 November 1977.

It was upgraded as Yogi Vemana University by the Government of Andhra Pradesh through an Act of A.P. Legislative Assembly on 9 March 2006. Prof. G. Siva Reddy was the head of SV PG Centre when upgraded to University & he oversee the campus development, along with other department heads. Arjula Ramachandra Reddy, an eminent biologist, was the first vice-chancellor of Yogi Vemana University, Kadapa.

The Yogi Vemana University, semi-residential in character, has unitary status and potential for phenomenal academic growth in the disciplines of Modern Sciences and Technologies, Humanities and social Sciences in the years to come.

Academics

Yogi Vemana University has at present 15 departments offering courses at post graduate level in 17 disciplines in Languages/ Humanities/Physical and Bio-Sciences, Human Resources Management, MBA & MCA and new sciences like Biotechnology, Bioinformatics, Geoinformatics and Earth Sciences. The university has also introduced five-year integrated M.Sc. courses in Earth Sciences and Bioinformatics in the year 2007–08.

C.P. Brown Library with its rich collection of rare books, ancient documents and relics, situated in Kadapa is part of Yogi Vemana University providing research facilities in several disciplines. The library has rare collection of manuscripts of 11th century.

Engineering campus

Yogi Vemana University College of Engineering, Proddatur was established in 2008–2009 and renamed as YSR Engineering College of Yogi Vemana University in the year 2010. It offers six conventional disciplines of Civil, Computer Science, Electronics & Communications, Information Technology, Mechanical and Electrical & Electronics Engineering leading to the Degree of Bachelor of Engineering. Along with the above the college is offered a new course in "Metallurgical Engineering" from the ensuing academic year.

There are six engineering courses in that college. Metallurgy and material technology (MMT), computer science engineering, civil engineering, mechanical engineering, electric and electronic engineering, electronics and communication engineering. The principal of this college is Prof. B. Jayarami Reddy.

Achievements
Yogi Vemana University bagged 92 Rank in India's Top 100 Universities. Yogi Vemana University also got ' B ' grade Accreditation By National Assessment and Accreditation Council.

Notable people
Professor Rachapalem Chandrasekhara Reddy - Winner of prestigious Kendra Sahitaya Academy Award in Telugu language for 2014.

References

External links
Official website
Study Center details
CP Brown Library News update

Universities in Andhra Pradesh
Universities and colleges in Kadapa district
Educational institutions established in 2006
2006 establishments in Andhra Pradesh